The 2006–2007 Jordan League was the 55th season of Jordan Premier League, the top-flight league for Jordanian association football clubs. The championship was won by Al-Wehdat, while Al-Yarmouk and Ittihad Al-Ramtha  were relegated. A total of 10 teams participated.

Teams

Map

League standings

References

2003
Jordan
1